Wildfire at Midnight is a novel by Mary Stewart which was first published in 1956. Stewart herself described the book as "an attempt at something different, the classic closed-room detective story with restricted action, a biggish cast, and a closely circular plot".

Synopsis 

Fashion model Gianetta Brooke leaves her usual glamorous surroundings to go on holiday to the Scottish island of Skye, only to find that her ex-husband, writer Nicholas Drury, is staying at the same hotel in Camasunary.  Set against the backdrop of recent events at the time of publication—the coronation of Queen Elizabeth II and the Hillary expedition that was the first to reach the summit of Mount Everest—this romantic suspense novel now has a "bygone era" sense of time and place.

After two murders take place locally, suspicion falls on the hotel guests, who include an aging "femme-fatale" star stage actress, a mountaineer, a possessive climber and her ingenue apprentice, a jealous wife and philandering husband, an old acquaintance of Gianetta's and Nicholas's, a writer of travel guides, and a handsome local versed in pagan folklore.  Gianetta, above suspicion due to her more recent arrival at the hotel, finds herself divided when assisting the police, torn between old loyalties,  new sympathies, and her civic duty.

Background and analysis
The mystery component blends 1953 news events with mountaineering, druid mythology and pagan ritual, along with conflicting views about the conquering of nature: heroic progress or human arrogance?  Stewart was familiar with the Isle of Skye, which she had visited with her husband on tours of Scotland.

References

1956 British novels
Novels by Mary Stewart
Novels set in Highland (council area)
Novels set in hotels
Isle of Skye
Novels set on islands
Hodder & Stoughton books